Wang Zhiming is a Paralympian athlete from China competing mainly in F40 classification throwing events.

Wang represented China at the 2012 Summer Paralympics in London, entering the shot put, javelin throw and discus throw events. He won all three events in his classification and broke the world record with his final throw, recording a distance of 47.95 metres.

Notes

Paralympic athletes of China
Athletes (track and field) at the 2012 Summer Paralympics
Paralympic gold medalists for China
Living people
Medalists at the 2012 Summer Paralympics
Chinese male discus throwers
Chinese male javelin throwers
Chinese male shot putters
Year of birth missing (living people)
Paralympic medalists in athletics (track and field)
21st-century Chinese people